The World Figure Skating Championships is an annual figure skating competition sanctioned by the International Skating Union in which figure skaters compete for the title of World Champion.

Men's competitions took place from February 25 to 26 in Berlin, Germany. Ladies' and pairs' competitions took place from March 5 to 6 in London, United Kingdom.

Results

Men

Judges:
 K. M. Beaumont 
 Harald. Rooth 
 Otto Maly 
 Ludwig Fänner 
 Otto Schöning

Ladies

Judges:
 Willy Böckl 
 B. Björjeson 
 Herbert J. Clarke 
 René Japiot 
 Ulrich Salchow

Pairs

Judges:
 Ulrich Salchow 
 Willy Böckl 
 B. Björjeson 
 René Japiot 
 Herbert Yglesias

Sources
 Result list provided by the ISU

World Figure Skating Championships
World Figure Skating Championships
World 1928
World 1928
1920s in Berlin
World Figure Skating Championships
World Figure Skating Championships, 1928
World Figure Skating Championships, 1928
World Figure Skating Championships
World Figure Skating Championships